Lysinibacillus parviboronicapiens is a Gram-positive, rod-shaped, spore-forming and motile bacterium from the genus of Lysinibacillus which has been isolated from soil.

References

Bacillaceae
Bacteria described in 2009